Neuilly-sur-Marne is a French commune in the 
Seine-Saint-Denis department, Île-de-France.

Geography 
Crossed by the river Marne.

Climate
Neuilly-sur-Marne has a oceanic climate (Köppen climate classification Cfb).

History 
On 13 April 1892, a third of the territory of Neuilly-sur-Marne was detached and became the commune of Neuilly-Plaisance.

Transport 
Neuilly-sur-Marne is served by no station of the Paris Métro, RER, or suburban rail network. The closest station to Neuilly-sur-Marne is Neuilly-Plaisance station on Paris RER line A. This station is located in the neighboring commune of Neuilly-Plaisance,  from the town center of Neuilly-sur-Marne.

Education 
Schools in the commune:
 12 preschools/nursery schools (maternelles): 
 10 elementary schools
 Junior high schools (collèges): Georges Braque, Albert Camus, and Honoré de Balzac
 1 Senior high school/sixth-form college : Lycée Cugnot

Senior high schools/sixth-form colleges in the surrounding area include:
 Lycée Georges Clemenceau - Villemomble
 Lycée Gustave Eiffel - Gagny
 Lycée Evariste Galois - Noisy-le-Grand

Monuments
 Church of Saint Baudilus

Personalities 
 Evens Joseph, footballer
 Sylvain Wiltord, footballer 
 William Vainqueur, footballer

Heraldry

See also 
 Communes of the Seine-Saint-Denis department

References

External links 

Official website (in French)

Communes of Seine-Saint-Denis